Ayssènes is a commune in the Aveyron department in the Occitanie region of southern France.

The inhabitants of the commune are known as Ayssenols or Ayssenoles.

Geography

Ayssènes is located some 25 km west of Millau and 7 km south-east of Alrance. Access to the commune is by the D510 road from Villefranche-de-Panat in the west which passes through the commune by a circuitous route to the village then continues south across the river to join the D200 on the opposite bank. Apart from the village there are the hamlets of:

Ardennes
Le Bastizou
Cabière
Calmels
Le Caussanal
La Caze
La Clerguie
Coupiaguet
Le Crouzet
Les Esclots
Lescure
Melet
Le Pouget
Rentières
Saint-Rémy
Vabrette
Valergues
Verdalle
Vernet

The commune is mainly forest with large areas of farmland.

The southern border of the commune is formed by the Tarn river which is dammed just south-west of the commune to form a long lake along the southern border. From the dam the Tarn continues south-west to eventually join the Garonne just west of Moissac. The Ruisseau de Vernobre rises in the north of the commune and flows south, gathering many tributaries, to join the Tarn. The Ruisseau de Coudols flows from the north-east, gathering some tributaries in the commune, and joins the Tarn at the same point as the Ruisseau de Vernobre.

Neighbouring communes and villages

History

Middle Ages
The village was built on a ridge overlooking the Tarn and was a direct link between the Lévézou Plateau and Raspes du Tarn. There was once a fortress on the peak of Roc Saint-Jean. It belonged to the Count of Rodez who maintained a garrison in order to maintain his influence over the southern Rouergue. Prestigious guests stayed at this location including the King of France, Charles VII, on 13 May 1437 while returning from Languedoc where he had been to restore order.

Modern Era
The castle was the subject of much covetousness during the wars of religion. In October 1586 the army of the Duke of Joyeuse, Anne de Joyeuse - brother of King Henry III, tried to besiege it. The Captain of the garrison made a ploy and the duke's army retreated towards the plateau of Saint-Victor which was where the garrison captain attacked the camp at night - taking fifty horses and capturing several soldiers. The fortress became dangerous for the kingdom and was destroyed in 1629 by order of Cardinal Richelieu. Today nothing remains but the location has one of the most beautiful views in the region.

Contemporary era
The commune consisted of four parishes in the second half of the 19th century with a population of around 1500. Today there are no more than 213 year-round residents.

Heraldry

Administration

List of Successive Mayors

Demography
In 2017 the commune had 216 inhabitants.

Sites and monuments

The Old Ayssènes Cemetery (graves from the early 19th century).
The Roc Saint-Jean (The castle disappeared after Richelieu ordered its destruction)
The Roc du Cavalier
The Church of the Nativity of Mary (Ayssènes) (19th century)
The Church of Saint-Amans (at Coupiaguet) (19th century)
The Church of Saint Rémy (at Saint-Rémy) (19th century)
The Church of Saint-Blaise or of the Purification of Notre-Dame (at Vabrette) (19th century). The church contains two items that are registered as historical objects:
A Chasuble (18th century)
A Chasuble (18th century)
The House of Chestnuts'Notable people linked to the communeAntoine Salvanh (1479-1555). Architect specialising in religious buildings, builder of the bell tower on Rodez Cathedral between 1513 and 1526.Guillaume Molinier-Lamothe (1736-1794). Refractory priest jailed in 1793 in Rodez then deported to the Fort du Hâ at Bordeaux the following year where he died.Georges Connes (1890-1974). Senior lecturer at the University of Dijon, Doctor of Literature, Dean of the University of Dijon in 1946 and 1947, resistance fighter in 1943, Mayor of Dijon after the liberation of the city in September 1944.Pierre-Damien Hèbles (1864-1954). Priest for Ayssènes from 1903 to 1944, member of the literary society of Aveyron, historian for the Raspes du Tarn region. He wrote three manuscripts on local history after 40 years of research in the departmental archives and deeds.Gaston Boulouis (1908-1991) Priest, Professor of Literature at the Seminary Minor of Saint Pierre and at the Sainte Marie de Rodez Institution. Canon, historian and occitan scholar at the end of his life. He published several historical books on the region as well as an autobiography and a collection of Occitan proverbs.Alain Marc (born in 1957). Politician, Municipal councillor for Ayssènes from 2001 to 2004, he has been MP for Aveyron since 2007.

See also
Communes of the Aveyron department

Bibliography
Christian-Pierre Bedel, preface by Alain Marc, Sant-Roma, Aissenas, Broquièrs, Brossa, Las Còstas, L'Estrada, Sant-Victor, Lo Truèlh / Christian-Pierre Bedel e los estatjants del canton de Sant-Roma'', Rodez, Departmental Mission for culture, 1995, Al canton collection, 239 pages, ill., cov. ill., 28 cm, ISSN 1151-8375, BnF 366885722

References

External links
Canton of Saint-Rome de Tarn website 
Ayssènes on Géoportail, National Geographic Institute (IGN) website 
Ayßene on the 1750 Cassini Map

Communes of Aveyron